El Gordo (lit. The Fat One) (ACT-CL J0102-4915 or SPT-CL J0102-4915) is the largest distant galaxy cluster observed at its distance or beyond, as of 2011. As of 2014, it still holds the record for being the largest distant galaxy cluster to have been discovered with a mass of three quadrillion suns. It was found by NASA's Chandra X-ray Observatory, Atacama Cosmology Telescope—funded by National Science Foundation, and European Southern Observatory's Very Large Telescope.

This galaxy cluster, officially named as, 'ACT-CL J0102-4915', has been given a 'nickname' by the researchers as 'El Gordo', which stands for "the Fat One" or "the Big One" in Spanish. It is located more than 7 billion light-years from Earth.

Findings and results on 'El Gordo' were announced at the 219th meeting of American Astronomical Society in Austin, Texas.

El Gordo and ΛCDM
This interacting cluster presents problems for the conventional Lambda-CDM model of cosmology because it is hard to reconcile ΛCDM's model of galaxy formation with the combination of how early El Gordo is observed in cosmic history, its large mass, and its high collision velocity.

Observations
Findings from the European Southern Observatory's Very Large Telescope and the Chandra X-ray Observatory show that El Gordo is composed of two separate galaxy subclusters, colliding at several million kilometers per hour. These observations (using X-ray data and other characteristics) suggest that El Gordo most probably formed in the same manner as the Bullet Cluster (which is located 4 billion light-years from Earth).

Gallery

See also
 List of galaxy groups and clusters
RCS2 J2327, another galaxy cluster being the second-most-massive galaxy cluster at a record of two quadrillion, or two million billion, suns.

References

External links
 El Gordo Galaxy Cluster
 El Gordo: A 'Fat' Distant Galaxy Cluster
 El Gordo (ACT-CL J0102-4915): NASA's Chandra Finds Largest Galaxy Cluster in Early Universe

Galaxy clusters
2012 in science
Phoenix (constellation)
Articles containing video clips